Live on Bowen was a one-hour Melbourne comedy talk show and variety show produced by RMITV with the support of the RMIT Student Union which aired on C31 Melbourne. The show featured comedic segments, special guest interviews and music acts ranging from the up-and-coming to high-profile artists. Like its predecessor Studio A, the show aimed to provide a platform to showcase an array of Melbourne’s up and coming talent.

Origin of the name
The word Bowen was taken from the name of the street that runs through the RMIT City Campus which building 12, the building the TV Studios are located, was situated.

Live broadcast
The show was broadcast live to air on C31 Melbourne from the TV Studios at RMIT University's City Campus for the first 3 seasons (2012-2013). As of Season 4 2014, C31 Melbourne relocated from their premises on the corner of Victoria and Swanston Streets to William Street near Flagstaff railway station, rendering the RMIT to C31 Melbourne Microwave link useless. Thus since then the show had been prerecorded as live in front of a live audience a week prior to broadcast.

Hosts
The show was first hosted by Australian actor, comedian Rob Lloyd until Episode 8 of the 2nd season. Aaron McCarthy filled in for Rob for the remainder of the second season, while Rob was on tour with Who, Me at Edinburgh Festival Fringe, and was subsequently named host for the third and fourth seasons. Up and coming comedian and writer Simon Taylor took over the reins as host as of the fifth season until the shows sixth and final season.

Guests
Guests have included Shaun Micallef, Amberley Lobo, Roz Hammond, Tim Ferguson, Rebecca Barnard, Sean Maher, Mitch Pileggi, Scott Allie, Marieke Guehrer, Cosentino (illusionist), Father Bob, Steve Bastoni, Adam Richard, Jason Chatfield, Paul Verhoeven, Andy Murphy, Claire Hooper, Catriona Rowntree, Scott Darlow Zoe Tuckwell-Smith, Peter Hitchener, Graeme Simsion Jarryd Blair, Erin Holland, Heath McIvor - Randy Shura Taft, Tom Ward, Virginia Gay, Tom Hafey, Tottie Goldsmith, John Safran, Lola Berry, Steph Hickey, Nicholas J Johnson, Faiser Heigns, Jimmy James Eaton, Liam Amor, Brodie Harper, Lee Chan, Elena Kirschbaum (Ella Bella), Rachel Bergman, Danny McGinley, Greg Male, Lili Kendall

Comedians
Some of the comedians that have performed stand up spots on the show are John Dore, Russell Wiggington, Rob Caruana, Demi Lardner, Jay Morrissey, Peter Jones, Sonia Di Lorio, Wendy Little, Simon Taylor, Hayman Kent, Bad Boys of Musical Theater, Michael Connell, Anthony Jeannot, Dilruk Jayasinha, JMac, Toby Halligan, Em O’Lockland, Charles Barington, Kate McLennan, Jennifer Wong, Wrongtown, Dave Warnake, Michael Connel, Petra Elliott, Ryan Coffey, Alasdair Temblay-Birchall, Phil Andrews, Tim Clarke, Jack Druce, Tony Besselink, Adam Francis,

Musicians
Some of the musicians and bands that have performed on the show are Benjamin Provest, Joshua Aiello, Woodlock, Better than Wizzards, Buchanan, Amistat, Shelley Segal, The Zanes, The Mear Poets, Dizzy Dee, July Days, Ben Abraham, Ten Thousand, Blackchords, Nicholas Roy, Red Ink, Jen Cloher, Courtney Barnett, EMPRA

Graphics and titles
Much of the animated GFX and title packages including the animated sequence seen at the beginning of the show were created by Jumbla Pty Ltd

Cast

Fill-in presenters for Rob Lloyd: Aaron McCarthy

Awards

Antenna Awards

|-
! scope="row" rowspan="3" | 2014
| Live On Bowen
| Outstanding Comedy Program
| 
|-
| Live On Bowen
| Outstanding Creative Achievement In A Program
| 
|-
| Aaron McCarthy
| Outstanding Male Personality
| 
|-
! scope="row" rowspan="3" | 2019
| Live On Bowen
| Best Comedy Program
| 
|-
| Francis McKenna, Alex Marshall, Edward Hirst, Krissie Karpinski and James Bull
| Outstanding Sound in a Program
| 
|-
| Simon Taylor
| Personality of the Year
|

References

External links
 

Australian community access television shows
English-language television shows
2012 Australian television series debuts
2015 Australian television series endings
RMITV flagship productions
RMITV productions
Television shows set in Melbourne